Burks House may refer to:

Burks House (Merryville, Louisiana), listed on the NRHP in Louisiana
Burks-Guy-Hagen House, Bedford, Virginia, listed on the NRHP in Virginia

See also
 Burk House (disambiguation)
 Burks (disambiguation)